Hawthorne Historic District is a national historic district located at Huntington, Cabell County, West Virginia. The district encompasses 24 contributing buildings and 1 contributing structure (stone retaining walls) in the Park Hills Subdivision No. 1. The district is composed entirely of early 20th century residences, the majority of which are Colonial Revival style.

It was listed on the National Register of Historic Places in 2007.

References

Houses on the National Register of Historic Places in West Virginia
Historic districts in Cabell County, West Virginia
Colonial Revival architecture in West Virginia
Houses in Huntington, West Virginia
National Register of Historic Places in Cabell County, West Virginia
Historic districts on the National Register of Historic Places in West Virginia